Hopkinton School District is a public school district located in Hopkinton, New Hampshire, U.S. The district serves about 900 students in four schools.

Schools

High schools
Hopkinton High School

Middle schools
Hopkinton Middle School (combined in same building as high school)

Elementary schools
Maple Street School 4-6

Harold Martin School PK-3

School Board

References

External links

 
School districts in New Hampshire